Brentor railway station used to serve the village of Brentor in Devon, England. It opened on 1 June 1890 and closed on 6 May 1968.

After closure and the track was removed, the space between the platforms filled in and the station building converted to a private house.

References

Railway stations in Great Britain opened in 1890
Disused railway stations in Devon
Former Plymouth, Devonport and South Western Junction Railway stations
Railway stations in Great Britain closed in 1968
Beeching closures in England